Maciej Gajos (born 19 March 1991) is a Polish footballer who plays as an attacking midfielder for Lechia Gdańsk in the Ekstraklasa.

International career
Gajos got his first call up to the senior Poland squad for a UEFA Euro 2016 qualifier against Republic of Ireland in March 2015.

Career statistics

1 Including Polish Super Cup.

Honours

Club
Lech Poznań
 Polish Super Cup: 2016

Lechia Gdańsk
 Polish Super Cup: 2019

References

External links
 
 

1991 births
Living people
Polish footballers
Association football midfielders
Raków Częstochowa players
Jagiellonia Białystok players
Lech Poznań players
Lech Poznań II players
Lechia Gdańsk players
Ekstraklasa players
II liga players
III liga players
People from Częstochowa County